Elmer Grant Gilbert was an American aerospace engineer and a Professor Emeritus of Aerospace Engineering at the University of Michigan. He received his Ph.D. in Instrumentation Engineering from Michigan in 1957.

He was a member of the National Academy of Engineering and a recipient of the 1994 IEEE Control Systems Award (the citation reads: "for pioneering and innovative contributions to linear state space theory and its applications, especially realization and decoupling, as well as to control algorithms") and the 1996 Richard E. Bellman Control Heritage Award from the American Automatic Control Council.

References

External links
 NAE profile
 
 First-Hand: Reminiscences on My Career in Control video on the Engineering and Technology History Wiki
 Faculty History Project at the University of Michigan
 Professional biography from University of Michigan Aerospace
 Cirriculum Vitae
 Obituary from University of Michigan Aerospace

American aerospace engineers
Control theorists
Living people
Members of the United States National Academy of Engineering
Richard E. Bellman Control Heritage Award recipients
University of Michigan College of Engineering alumni
University of Michigan faculty
Scientists from Michigan
20th-century American engineers
21st-century American engineers
1930 births
Fellow Members of the IEEE